Shirley Wohl Kram (December 25, 1922 – August 21, 2009) was a United States district judge of the United States District Court for the Southern District of New York.

Education and career

Born in New York City, New York, Kram received a Bachelor of Laws from Brooklyn Law School in 1950. She was an attorney with the Legal Aid Society of New York City from 1951 to 1953, and was in private practice of law in New York City from 1954 to 1960. She was an assistant attorney in charge of the Harlem Office of the Legal Aid Society of New York from 1962 to 1971, and was chief of the Narcotics and Mental Health Division throughout that time. She was a judge of the New York City Family Court in Manhattan from 1971 to 1983.

Federal judicial service

On January 31, 1983, Kram was nominated by President Ronald Reagan to a seat on the United States District Court for the Southern District of New York vacated by Judge Lawrence W. Pierce. She was confirmed by the United States Senate on March 2, 1983, and received her commission the same day. She assumed senior status on May 23, 1993, and served in that capacity until her death, in 2009.

References

Sources
 

1922 births
2009 deaths
Brooklyn Law School alumni
Judges of the United States District Court for the Southern District of New York
United States district court judges appointed by Ronald Reagan
20th-century American judges
Lawyers from New York City
20th-century American women judges